Philippe II may refer to:

 Philippe II of France (1165–1223)
 Philippe II de Croÿ (1496–1549)
 Philippe II, Duke of Orléans (1674–1723)

See also
 Philip II (disambiguation)